Scary Monsters and Nice Sprites is the second extended play (EP) by American electronic music producer Skrillex. It was released exclusively through Beatport on October 22, 2010 through mau5trap and Big Beat Records, while being released on December 20 for digital download via other online retailers and on March 1, 2011 as a physical release. It was recorded in 2010 at Skrillex's apartment using a laptop. The EP features guest contributions from pennybirdrabbit, Foreign Beggars and Bare Noize as well as remixes done by Noisia, Zedd and Bare Noize. It won two Grammys at the 54th Annual Grammy Awards: one for Best Dance Recording, and another for Best Dance/Electronica Album.

The EP received generally positive reviews from music critics and became a moderate commercial success, reaching number 49 on the Billboard 200, while also topping the Billboard Heatseekers Albums chart and reaching number 28 in Australia. As of November 2011, the EP was certified Gold in Canada with sales exceeding 40,000 copies. The EP's lead single, "Scary Monsters and Nice Sprites", was a moderate commercial success internationally, peaking within the charts of the United States, United Kingdom, Australia, Canada and Sweden. It was later certified Gold by the Recording Industry Association of America (RIAA), with sales exceeding 500,000. On November 30, 2011, it was announced that the EP was nominated at the 54th Grammy Awards for Best Dance/Electronica Album. On February 12, 2012, the album won the Grammy for that category. A follow-up EP, More Monsters and Sprites, contains several remixes of the title track done by Dirtyphonics, Phonat, The Juggernaut and Kaskade. It is named after David Bowie's 1980 album Scary Monsters (And Super Creeps).

Reception

Critical response 

Scary Monsters and Nice Sprites received generally positive reviews from music critics. Jon O'Brien from AllMusic gave the EP a positive review, saying, "The three remixes from Noisia, Bare Noize, and Zedd are solid if unspectacular, with only the latter's chilled-out version of the title track providing anything wildly different from the originals. But the invention showcased on the first six bass-heavy anthems is more than enough to suggest that the U.S. has found someone who is capable of selling the dubstep sound back to its South London homeland". Alternative Press also gave a positive review, saying, "On Scary Monsters and Nice Sprites, Moore has hit his mash-up groove, combining monster dance riffs with melodic ambience. The EP title is fitting, since these nine tracks (three of which are remixes) embody both sides of Moore; the rambunctious, punk-rock kid who screamed his head off in From First to Last (see the chaos of 'Kill EVERYBODY'), but also the melodic, pensive adult who can seamlessly collaborate with pop singers like Penny and producers and rappers like Bare Noize and Foreign Beggars".

Track listing

Charts and certifications

Commercial performance
The EP has since become a moderate commercial success. In the United States, it has reached a peak of number forty-nine on the Billboard 200, and has spent more than thirty weeks within the chart. It has also reached the summit of the Billboard Heatseekers Albums chart, as well as number three on the Dance/Electronic Albums. It reached number twenty-eight on the ARIA Charts in Australia.

As of October 3, 2013, the single "Scary Monsters And Nice Sprites" has reached double platinum status, with sales of over 2,000,000 copies

Weekly charts

Year-end

Certifications

Release history

References

2010 EPs
Skrillex albums
Grammy Award for Best Dance/Electronica Album
Mau5trap albums
Big Beat Records (American record label) albums
Albums produced by Skrillex